John Hanbury Pawle (18 May 1915 – 20 January 2010) was an English sportsman, stockbroker and painter.

Pawle was educated at Harrow School, where he played cricket for the school and was captain in 1934, and Pembroke College, Cambridge, where he won blues in 1936 and 1937 as well as playing for Essex. Later he played for Marylebone Cricket Club (MCC) and Free Foresters. At Cambridge he also won a blue for tennis in 1936 and half-blues for real tennis in 1935, 1936 and 1937.

On the outbreak of war in 1939 Pawle joined the Royal Navy and served in destroyers. After the war he became a partner in a firm of stockbrokers in the City of London. He was British amateur racquets champion four years running, 1947–50, and was twice in the world singles final, losing each time to Jim Dear.

Pawle had studied at Westminster School of Art before the war, but did not devote himself to painting until he retired from the City in 1979, when he became a full-time artist, holding a number of one-man shows.

References

1915 births
2010 deaths
English cricketers
Essex cricketers
People from Widford, Hertfordshire
Cambridge University cricketers
Marylebone Cricket Club cricketers
Free Foresters cricketers
Hertfordshire cricketers
People educated at Harrow School
Alumni of Pembroke College, Cambridge
Royal Navy officers of World War II
English stockbrokers
20th-century English painters
English racquets players
English real tennis players
20th-century English businesspeople